The Henshie-Briggs Row House is a historic building located in Des Moines, Iowa, United States.  While the row house was a popular building form in the 19th century in the city, there are very few examples that remain.  The two-story, brick, Italianate structure was completed in 1883.  The single-family dwelling features brick load-bearing walls, a flat roof, and a wooden cornice.  The house was listed on the National Register of Historic Places in 2001.  It was moved to its current location on Woodland Avenue in 2008.

References

Houses completed in 1883
Italianate architecture in Iowa
Houses in Des Moines, Iowa
National Register of Historic Places in Des Moines, Iowa
Houses on the National Register of Historic Places in Iowa